The St. Croix Crossing is an extradosed bridge that spans the St. Croix River, between Oak Park Heights, Minnesota and St. Joseph, Wisconsin.  Connecting Minnesota State Highway 36 and Wisconsin State Highway 64, the bridge carries four lanes of traffic (two lanes in each direction), and includes a bike/pedestrian path on the north side.

History 
MnDOT, WisDOT, and the Federal Highway Administration were seeking a replacement for the nearly 90 year old Stillwater Bridge, which was frequently congested, inadequate for modern traffic, and was deteriorating from its age. The St. Croix River Crossing Project called for the construction of a new four-lane bridge less than a mile downriver, followed by the conversion of the Stillwater Bridge to pedestrian and bicycle use. Originally, construction of this bridge was planned to start in 2024, but legislation was passed requiring the Department of Transportation to address aging bridges by 2018, and the start date was moved up to 2013. However, on March 11, 2010, a federal judge ruled that the government had violated its rules in approving the bridge design, which sent the process back to an earlier stage.  Because the bridge traverses the Saint Croix National Scenic Riverway, construction could only proceed following federal legislation which granted an exemption to the Wild and Scenic Rivers Act. The extradosed bridge design results in less piers compared to a box girder bridge, improving maritime navigation and reducing environmental impact. While compared to a traditional cable-stayed bridge, tower height is lower and thus does not overwhelming the scenery of the Saint Croix riverway.

Construction on the bridge began with the piers in 2014.  The bridge was opened to vehicle traffic following a ribbon-cutting ceremony on August 2, 2017.

See also 
Stillwater Bridge (St. Croix River)
Soo Line High Bridge
Prescott Drawbridge

References

Extradosed bridges
Extradosed bridges in the United States
Bridges completed in 2017
Buildings and structures in St. Croix County, Wisconsin
Buildings and structures in Washington County, Minnesota
Road bridges in Minnesota
Road bridges in Wisconsin
Transportation in St. Croix County, Wisconsin
Transportation in Washington County, Minnesota
Bridges over the St. Croix River (Wisconsin–Minnesota)